W. H. Seward Thomson (December 16, 1856 – November 29, 1932) was a United States district judge of the United States District Court for the Western District of Pennsylvania.

Education and career

Born in Beaver County, Pennsylvania, Thomson attended Washington and Jefferson College, and Marshall College (now Marshall University) in Huntington, West Virginia before reading law to enter the bar in 1880. He was in private practice in Beaver, Pennsylvania from 1881 to 1894, and then in Pittsburgh, Pennsylvania until 1914.

Federal judicial service

On July 7, 1914, Thomson was nominated by President Woodrow Wilson to a seat on the United States District Court for the Western District of Pennsylvania vacated by Judge James Scott Young. Thomson was confirmed by the United States Senate on July 21, 1914, and received his commission the same day. He assumed senior status on February 21, 1928, serving in that capacity until his death on November 29, 1932.

References

Sources
 

1856 births
1932 deaths
People from Beaver County, Pennsylvania
Judges of the United States District Court for the Western District of Pennsylvania
Marshall University alumni
Washington & Jefferson College alumni
United States district court judges appointed by Woodrow Wilson
20th-century American judges
United States federal judges admitted to the practice of law by reading law